Desnethé—Missinippi—Churchill River (formerly known as Churchill River) is a federal electoral district in Saskatchewan, Canada, that has been represented in the House of Commons of Canada since 1997.

Geography
This is a rural riding located in northern Saskatchewan. The riding encompasses the northern half of the province and is the third largest federal riding, that is located in a province, in Canada, trumped only by Churchill—Keewatinook Aski in Manitoba and Abitibi—Baie-James—Nunavik—Eeyou in Quebec. The territorial ridings of Yukon, Northwest Territories and Nunavut are also larger.

Demographics
According to the Canada 2011 Census; 2013 representation

Ethnic groups: 70.6% Aboriginal, 28.7% White 
Languages: 64.6% English, 21.3% Cree, 10.8% Dene, 1.3% French 
Religions: 76.8% Christian (41.5% Catholic, 18.5% Anglican, 4.1% United Church, 2.5% Lutheran, 1.6% Pentecostal, 8.5% Other), 2.7% Traditional Aboriginal Spirituality, 20.4% No religion 
Median income (2010): $18,910 
Average income (2010): $28,554

Desnethé—Missinippi—Churchill River boasts the following demographic records:

 Highest % of people of the Métis aboriginal group (16.4%)
 Highest % of people of Métis ethnic origin (12.0%)
 Highest % of people with Dene as their mother tongue (10.5%)

History
The electoral district was created as "Churchill River" in 1996 from Prince Albert—Churchill River, Mackenzie and The Battlefords—Meadow Lake ridings.

In 2004, it was renamed "Desnethé—Missinippi—Churchill River".

This riding lost territory to Prince Albert and a fraction to Yorkton—Melville, and gained a fraction of territory from Prince Albert during the 2012 electoral redistribution.

2006 election controversy
In the 2006 federal election, Liberal candidate Gary Merasty defeated incumbent Conservative MP Jeremy Harrison by a slim margin of 68 votes after trailing much of the election night, despite Harrison's vote increasing several points. Merasty's win raised issues of questionable tactics to increase voter turnout. However, an investigation conducted by Elections Canada determined that no wrongdoing had taken place.

2015 election recount
In the 2015 federal election, New Democrat candidate Georgina Jolibois defeated the Liberal candidate, Lawrence Joseph, by a narrow margin of 71 votes. Joseph requested a judicial recount of the votes.

Members of Parliament

This riding has elected the following members of the House of Commons of Canada:

Election results

Desnethé—Missinippi—Churchill River, 2004–present

Churchill River, 1997–2004

See also
 List of Canadian federal electoral districts
 Past Canadian electoral districts

References

Notes

External links
 
 
 Expenditures - 2008
 Expenditures - 2004
 Expenditures - 2000
 Expenditures - 1997
 Website of the Parliament of Canada

Saskatchewan federal electoral districts
Meadow Lake, Saskatchewan
Meadow Lake No. 588, Saskatchewan
Constituencies established in 1996
1996 establishments in Saskatchewan